Video games in Switzerland have been released since the 1980s. In 2016, there were between 100 and 120 game companies, mostly small, corresponding to about 500 employees and a turnover of about 50 millions Swiss francs (which corresponds more or less to the same amount in US dollars or Euro).

The Swiss Game Award was created in 2013, with some of the winners being Feist (2016), Deru (2017) and FAR: Lone Sails (2019).

Nowadays, there are Swiss games being released for all the current platforms: Nintendo Switch, PlayStation 4, Xbox One, Microsoft Windows, macOS, Android, iOS, including Apple Arcade.

History

1960s 

At 17, René Sommer created the earliest known electronic game in Switzerland, a variant of the Nim game. Sommer would later work as an engineer at Logitech.

1980s 

During the 1980s, a few Swiss games were created for C64 (e.g. Robox), Atari ST (e.g. War Heli, Clown-o-Mania) and Amiga (e.g. Insanity Fight, Ball Raider, Dugger) computers. Alain Berset, the member of the Swiss Federal Council in charge of culture, was developing video games in his youth and saving them on cassettes.

On the Swiss computers Smaky, games like Bong, Ping, or Mur were released. In 1988, the Smaky's mascot, appeared in a game for the first time, in Blupi at Home.

1990s 

Many Swiss games were released during the 1990s. As micro-computers became affordable in Switzerland and programming had been taught for years in schools, more and more games were created. Some are still known today because of their open source licences, e.g. The Last Eichhof (1993) or GLTron (1999), the latter being still regularly updated. Games appeared in various regions of Switzerland. At EPFL and then on external servers, some employees created and maintained a multi-user dungeon game situated in the Middle Earth, . GATE, a game similar to The Legend of Zelda was released on Apple IIGS and Macintosh, in 1991. The same year, Supaplex, similar to Boulder Dash, was released for Amiga and DOS computers. Traps 'n' Treasures, a role-playing video game, was released in 1993 on Amiga.

Most of the games created by Daniel Roux for Epsitec, a Swiss company producing the Smaky computers, were released between 1988 and 2003. Eleven of them displayed the brand mascot, a yellow character named . Some of these games were educational (e.g. Blupi at Home, Fun with Blupi), others were real-time simulation games (e.g. Planet Blupi) or platform games (e.g. Speedy Eggbert). Games were created first for Smaky, but were later adapted for DOS and Windows, and sometimes translated (in English, Korean, Hebrew, etc.). More than 100.000 copies of the Windows version of Speedy Eggbert were distributed in North America.

In 1997, a Tennis game was played remotely between EPFL and UNIGE with virtual reality devices and movement recognition, using telecommunications.

2000s 

In 2001, the Swiss Federal Office of Public Health released Catch the Sperm, a video game aimed at promoting prevention against HIV. The same year, Epsitec released an educational programming game offering to program a robot and solve tasks thanks to a lookalike C++ programming language.

In 2008, the Swiss game company GIANTS Software released Farming Simulator. The original game would be followed by yearly by a series of sequels.

Between 2008 and 2009, Pro Helvetia, the Swiss national foundation aimed at subsiding culture, mapped the existing Swiss game industry and evaluated that there was a potential for development. They launched in 2010 a program called Game Culture in order to help the development of video games in Switzerland. The program lasted 3 years, with a budget of 1.5 million CHF.

2010s 

The number of Swiss games released in the 2010s increased significantly thanks to mobile platforms (iOS and Android), digital distribution service Steam for computers, and more accessible game engines available to create games. At the same time, state subventions kept growing. Many Swiss games are released every year.

After Farming Simulator, another studio launched a series of simulator games. Released in 2014 by Urban Games, Train Fever allowed to be in charge of building train networks. It would be followed by Transport Fever in 2016 and Transport Fever 2 in 2019, which both included new types of vehicles.

In a report published in 2018, the Swiss Federal Council explained that  

In 2019, the Canton of Vaud launched funding to support game developers (50.000 CHF of financial help in total). It was the first Swiss Canton to do so.

Industry

Game designers 

 Michael Frei (Plug & Play, Kids)
 Daniel Lutz (Monospace, Colorblind, Hitman Go, Lara Croft Go)
 Sid Meier
 Mario von Rickenbach (Plug & Play, Kids)
 Christian Schnellmann (Aux B, Kind of Soccer)
  (Niche)
 Ru Weerasuriya (God of War: Chains of Olympus, God of War: Ghost of Sparta, The Order: 1886)

Associations/organisations 

 Pro Helvetia (State funding)
 The Swiss Game Developers Association (SGDA) (Developer representation)
 The Swiss chapter of the International Game Developers Association (Developer representation)
 SIEA (Game ratings and sales oversight)

Events 

 Polylan (Lausanne)
 Fantasy Basel
 Numerik Games (Yverdon)
 Ludicious Festival (Zurich)
 Game Z Festival (Zurich)
 Polymanga (Montreux)
 NIFFF (Neuchâtel)
 Japan Impact (Lausanne)
 SwitzerLan (Bern)
 Zurich Game Show (Zurich)
 RetroMania (Payerne)

Gamers Associations 
 Swiss E-Sport Federation (SESF, Electronic Sports in Switzerland)
 Gaming Federation (Video game culture promotion)

Schools/Academia

Education 

 Zurich University of the Arts (BA, MA)
 HEAD, Geneva (MA)
 ETHZ (MA)
 SAE Institute (BA)
 EPAC (MA)
 Swiss Game Academy
 HSLU, Digital Ideation (BA, MA)

Scientific research 

 bavelierlab at UNIGE. Lead by Daphné Bavelier, the goal of the laboratory is the study of brain plasticity, especially when video games are played.
 MMI (Mensch-Maschine Interaktion, or Human–computer interaction) at University of Basel.
 Game Technology Center at ETHZ.
 Zurich University of the Arts Gamelab.
 EPFL Immersive Interaction Research Group.
 GameLab UNIL-EPFL. A study group based in the faculty of Humanities of UNIL and college of humanities of EPFL.
 Eugen Pfister, with SNF Ambizione project "Horror-Game-Politics".
 TECFA, UNIGE.
 Pixelvetica, a project on the archiving of Swiss video games.

Museums/Exhibitions 

Exhibitions dedicated to games have happened in Switzerland.

 Maison d'Ailleurs
 Playtime — Videogame mythologies (11.03.2012 – 09.12.2012)
 L’expo dont vous êtes le héros (18.11.2018 – 27.10.2019)
 Musée Bolo
 Programmed disappearance (2012 – )
 MuDA (2015-2020), the Museum of Digital Arts. They exhibited video games over the years.
 Stadt Museum Aarau
 PLAY (21.09.2018 – 07.07.2019)
 Swiss National Museum
 Games – Geschichte der Videospiele (17.01.2020 – 06.09.2020)
 Games (21.03.2021 – 10.10.2021)

Further reading 

 Yves Delessert and Joëlle Libois. «Same player shoots again; étude sur les salles de jeux à Genève». Institut d'études sociales – Annales du Centre De Recherche Sociale (20), 1 October 1985.
 Matthieu Pellet and David Javet. «Switzerland», in Mark J. P. Wolf (ed.), Video Games around the World, The MIT Press, 2015.
 David Javet and Yannick Rochat. «Jeux vidéo suisses: état des lieux». Culture en jeu (54), April 2017.
 William Audureau. «La Suisse, pays des jeux vidéo déjantés, et plus si affinités». Le Monde, 19 August 2017.
 René Bauer and Beat Suter. «Nerds, Freaks und ihre Communities». Spiel-Kultur-Wissenschaft (research blog), 17 March 2021.

References 

Swiss culture
Swiss games
Video games developed in Switzerland
Video gaming in Switzerland